The following are public holidays in Liberia.

Public holidays

Former public holidays

References

Holidays
Liberian culture
Liberia
Liberia